Scopula transsecta is a moth of the  family Geometridae. It is found in Nigeria.

Subspecies
Scopula transsecta transsecta
Scopula transsecta dissimulans (Warren, 1899)

References

Endemic fauna of Nigeria
Moths described in 1898
transsecta
Insects of West Africa
Moths of Africa